In mathematics, specifically in topology,

In this sense interior and closure are dual notions.

The interior, boundary, and exterior of a subset together partition the whole space into three blocks (or fewer when one or more of these is empty).

Definitions

Interior point

(This is illustrated in the introductory section to this article.)

This definition generalizes to any subset  of a metric space  with metric :  is an interior point of  if there exists a real  number  such that  is in  whenever the distance 

This definition generalizes to topological spaces by replacing "open ball" with "open set".
(Equivalently,  is an interior point of  if  is a neighbourhood of )

Interior of a set

  is the largest open subset of  contained in 
  is the union of all open sets of  contained in 
  is the set of all interior points of 
If the space  is understood from context then the shorter notation  is usually preferred to

Examples

In any space, the interior of the empty set is the empty set.
In any space  if  then 
If  is the real line  (with the standard topology), then  whereas the interior of the set  of rational numbers is empty:  
If  is the complex plane  then 
In any Euclidean space, the interior of any finite set is the empty set.

On the set of real numbers, one can put other topologies rather than the standard one:

If  is the real numbers  with the lower limit topology, then 
If one considers on  the topology in which every set is open, then 
If one considers on  the topology in which the only open sets are the empty set and  itself, then  is the empty set.

These examples show that the interior of a set depends upon the topology of the underlying space.
The last two examples are special cases of the following.

In any discrete space, since every set is open, every set is equal to its interior.

Properties

Let  be a topological space and let  and  be subsets of 

  is open in 
 If  is open in  then  if and only if 
  is an open subset of  when  is given the subspace topology.
  is an open subset of  if and only if 
 : 
 : 
 /: 
 However, the interior operator does not distribute over unions since only  is guaranteed in general and equality might not hold. For example, if  and  then  is a proper subset of 
 /: If  then 

Other properties include:

Relationship with closure

The above statements will remain true if all instances of the symbols/words
"interior", "int", "open", "subset", and "largest"
are respectively replaced by
"closure", "cl", "closed", "superset", and "smallest"
and the following symbols are swapped:
 "" swapped with ""
 "" swapped with ""
For more details on this matter, see interior operator below or the article Kuratowski closure axioms.

Interior operator

and also

where  is the topological space containing  and the backslash  denotes set-theoretic difference.
Therefore, the abstract theory of closure operators and the Kuratowski closure axioms can be readily translated into the language of interior operators, by replacing sets with their complements in 

In general, the interior operator does not commute with unions. However, in a complete metric space the following result does hold:

The result above implies that every complete metric space is a Baire space.

Exterior of a set

Similarly, the interior is the exterior of the complement:

The interior, boundary, and exterior of a set  together partition the whole space into three blocks (or fewer when one or more of these is empty):

where  denotes the boundary of   The interior and exterior are always open, while the boundary is closed.

Some of the properties of the exterior operator are unlike those of the interior operator:
 The exterior operator reverses inclusions; if  then 
 The exterior operator is not idempotent.  It does have the property that

Interior-disjoint shapes

Interior-disjoint shapes may or may not intersect in their boundary.

See also

References

Bibliography

External links

 

Closure operators
General topology